Ludhiana International Airport is an under-construction international airport being constructed near the town of Halwara in Ludhiana, Punjab, India.

Once completed, it will be the third international airport in Punjab after Amritsar and Chandigarh. The site is 32-km drive from Ludhiana City and the Greater Ludhiana Area Development Authority (GLADA) has acquired 161.27 acres of land in Halwara for the building of a Ludhiana international civil terminal. The airport is being built to accommodate Boeing 737-700 and Airbus A-320 aircraft. The airport was planned to be operational by 31st March, 2022 but the project has been stalled since May after GLADA failed to release funds for its construction.
The construction for the airport was again started on 21st Nov 2022, after Punjab Government released funds through GLADA and Finance department.

See also
 Ludhiana Airport

References

Airports in Punjab, India
Proposed airports in Punjab, India
International airports in India
Transport in Ludhiana